Wandra was a wooden twin screw steamer built in 1907, for Allen Taylor & Company, by Denis Sullivan at Coopernook, New South Wales. Her hull was towed to Sydney for her engines to be fitted by Begg and Greig.

Fate

Some  North of Jervis Bay lighthouse the Wandra took on water in heavy seas. They made for the Drum and Drumsticks and dropped anchor but sank straight away. The crew got off safely and made their way to the lighthouse for the night.

Notes

1907 ships
Ships built in New South Wales
Merchant ships of Australia
Wooden steamships of Australia
Maritime incidents in 1915
1915 in Australia
Shipwrecks of the Shoalhaven Region